The 1888 Miami Redskins football team was an American football team that represented Miami University during the 1888 college football season. The 1888 team was Miami's first football team to compete in intercollegiate football.  The team played only one game, a scoreless tie with the University of Cincinnati football team at Oxford, Ohio, on December 8, 1888. The team did not have a paid coach from 1888 to 1894.  The 1888 game between Cincinnati and Miami was the first in what later became the Victory Bell series that has been included more than 110 games and is one of the oldest rivalries in college football. It was also the first college football game played in the State of Ohio.

The players on the first Miami football team included W. Chidlaw, S. Fox, J. Lough, F. McCracken, J. Macready, R. Mason, E. Reed, S. Stephenson, W. Stubbs, and S. Townsend.

Schedule

References

Miami
Miami RedHawks football seasons
College football undefeated seasons
College football winless seasons
Miami Redskins football